The 2010 Africa Cup was an incomplete edition of highest level rugby union tournament in Africa. The competition was arranged expecting the participation of twelve teams that were divided into three pools. The winner of each pool was admitted to the final stage.

The tournament was not completed and the title not assigned. After that the pool B was cancelled due to the withdrawal of three of four teams participating; the final stage was not played after Morocco withdrew from hosting the final.

Division 1 (Africa Cup)

Pools stage

Pool A 
The pool A was regularly played in Tunisia and won by Morocco.

Semifinals

3rd place final

Final

Pool B 
The tournament was originally scheduled in Youndé, but there was the withdraw of Kenya, Namibia and Uganda.

Pool C 
The tournament was played in Bulawayo, Zimbabwe and won by hosting team.

Semifinals

Third place final

Final

Final stage 
The final stage was originally scheduled for beginning of November in Morocco. After an initial proposal of Madagascar federation, the tournament was cancelled.

Division 2

Division 3

See also
2010 Victoria Cup

References

External links
2010 International Rugby Fixtures and Results - rugbyinternational.net

2010
2010 rugby union tournaments for national teams
2010 in African rugby union
June 2010 sports events in Africa
July 2010 sports events in Africa